John Kibet Koech (born 23 August 1995) is a Kenyan-born long-distance runner who competes internationally for Bahrain. He specialises in the 3000 metres steeplechase and was the winner of the event at the 2015 Asian Athletics Championships. His elder brother Isiah is an Olympic long-distance runner.

Koech first began competing at national level in the steeplechase in 2012, running at the national junior championships. He also acted as pacemaker at the Herculis meeting that year. The following year he won at the Kenyan Athletics Championships, but placed tenth at the national trial event for the 2013 World Championships in Athletics. His best performance of the year was a personal best of 8:16.96 minutes at the DN Galan, where he placed sixth – this time ranked him twentieth in the world for the event that season.

Koech switched his international eligibility to Bahrain in September 2013. In the 2014 season he competed extensively on the track and field circuit. He was runner-up to Jacob Araptany at the Golden Grand Prix in Japan, then had a season's best of 8:19.99 minutes in Bydgoszcz, which ultimately placed him in the top-25 in the year's world lists, as well as second in the world junior category lists. On the 2014 IAAF Diamond League circuit he was tenth at the Athletissima meeting and 13th at the Herculis meeting. As the second highest ranked Asian runner, after Abubaker Ali Kamal of Qatar (another Kenyan emigrant), he was selected to represent the region at the 2014 IAAF Continental Cup, where he placed fifth.

At the 2015 Arab Athletics Championships, held in Bahrain, he missed out on a steeplechase medal behind African opposition, taking fourth. A month later at the IAAF World Challenge Beijing he gave a stronger performance with a personal best of 8:14.75 minutes for third place. His first major title followed shortly after at the 2015 Asian Athletics Championships where he was the steeplechase gold medallist, succeeding his compatriot and fellow former Kenyan Tareq Mubarak Taher.

International competitions

References

Living people
1995 births
Kenyan male steeplechase runners
Bahraini male steeplechase runners
Kenyan male long-distance runners
Bahraini male long-distance runners
Kenyan emigrants to Bahrain
World Athletics Championships athletes for Bahrain
Athletes (track and field) at the 2016 Summer Olympics
Athletes (track and field) at the 2018 Asian Games
Olympic athletes of Bahrain
Asian Games competitors for Bahrain
Asian Athletics Championships winners
Athletes (track and field) at the 2020 Summer Olympics